Judgeford is a suburb of Porirua, a city near Wellington, New Zealand. The main buildings are a dog boarding place called Judgeford Kennels and Cattery, Judgeford golf course, some light industrial and other businesses, and houses. The closest school is Pāuatahanui School. There is a nearby church called Saint Albans Church, but it is in Pāuatahanui not Judgeford.

The headquarters of BRANZ, the Building Research Association of New Zealand, is at the beginning of Moonshine Road near Judgeford.

History
In the 1850s, immigrants from England came to Judgeford to settle land obtained from Māori by the Wellington Company. Most people farmed, and there were some sawmills. The area was originally called the Small Farms Settlement.

The Judgeford School, sometimes called the Small Farms School, opened on 6 October 1879, with 29 children taught by Miss Georgina Chatwin. When it reopened after the 1934 summer holidays there were only 8 children, and the school closed on 10 May 1935 with the remaining pupils following other children in the area to the Pāuatahanui School.

In 1883 people started to call the suburb Judgeford because of an early settler called Alfred Judge who had built his house close to a river. Hence the name Judge's Ford, which soon evolved into Judgeford.

In the 1890s the Abbott and Galloway families established a cooperative dairy business at the junction of Flightys Road and the Pāuatahanui-Haywards Road. It was primarily a creamery where the milk was separated and the cream sent elsewhere to make butter or cheese, and it operated for about 15 years until it burnt down in 1907.

In World War II the US Marines had four camps in the Pauatahanui area; the Judgeford camp accommodated 3,755 men.

Population
At the 2013 census, 1080 people lived in the Pāuatahanui area unit, which includes Judgeford.

References

External links
Items of Interest - Judgeford
Judgeford in the Cyclopaedia of New Zealand (1897, ETC)

Suburbs of Porirua